The 210s decade ran from January 1, 210, to December 31, 219.

Significant people

References